Jonathan Asselin (born 4 December 1958) is a Canadian equestrian. He competed in two events at the 2000 Summer Olympics.

References

External links
 

1958 births
Living people
Canadian male equestrians
Olympic equestrians of Canada
Equestrians at the 2000 Summer Olympics
Sportspeople from Montreal